Eagle River may refer to:

Streams
In the United States:
Eagle River (Bradfield Canal), Alaska
Eagle River (Colorado), a tributary of the Colorado River
Eagle River (Cook Inlet), Alaska
Eagle River (Favorite Channel), Alaska
Eagle River (Michigan), a river flowing into Lake Superior
Eagle River (Wisconsin), a tributary of the Wisconsin River

In Canada:
Eagle River (Labrador)
Two rivers in British Columbia:
Eagle River (Dease River), a river flowing into the Dease River
Eagle River (Shuswap Lake), a river flowing into Shuswap Lake

Communities
In the United States:
Eagle River, Alaska
Eagle River, Michigan
Eagle River, Wisconsin

In Canada:
 Eagle River, Ontario

Buildings
Eagle River Lighthouse, in Eagle River, Michigan, United States

See also 
 Eagle Creek (disambiguation)
 Eagle Lake (disambiguation)
 Eagle (disambiguation)
 Aigle River (disambiguation)